João Sousa was the defending champion but chose not to compete.

Tobias Kamke won the title, defeating Iñigo Cervantes Huegun in the final, 6–3, 6–2.

Seeds

  Blaž Rola (second round)
  Andreas Haider-Maurer (semifinals)
  Tobias Kamke (champion)
  Andrej Martin (semifinals)
  Wayne Odesnik (first round)
  Adrián Menéndez-Maceiras (quarterfinals)
  Grégoire Burquier (quarterfinals)
  Gastão Elias (second round)

Draw

Finals

Top half

Bottom half

References
 Main Draw
 Qualifying Draw

Franken Challengeandnbsp;- Singles
2014 Singles